Cuba High School Annex, also known as the Crawford County Historical Society Museum, is a historic school building located at Cuba, Crawford County, Missouri. It was built in 1934 with funds provided by either the Civil Works Administration or the Works Progress Administration. It is a two-story, rectangular building built on a raised basement. It measures 60 feet by 30 feet and has a hipped roof.  It is finished with random ashlar native stone laid in a “giraffe” pattern with grapevine joints.

It was listed on the National Register of Historic Places in 2013.

References

History museums in Missouri
Works Progress Administration in Missouri
School buildings on the National Register of Historic Places in Missouri
School buildings completed in 1934
Buildings and structures in Crawford County, Missouri
National Register of Historic Places in Crawford County, Missouri
1934 establishments in Missouri
New Deal in Missouri